Hyde and Shriek may refer to:
 Hyde and Shriek (graphic novel), a Hardy Boys graphic novel
 Hyde and Shriek (comics), a British comics series, published in The Dandy